The 2013 Discovery Women’s Basketball Invitational, also known as Jesse Robredo Memorial Cup to commemorate the first death anniversary of former Department of the Interior and Local Government secretary Jesse Robredo, was an invitational basketball tournament which was contested by the women's national teams of the Philippines and Singapore, along with a Gold Coast All Stars team assembled by Gold Coast Basketball of Australia. India was also invited to take part in the tournament but did not send its team due to a ban imposed on its National Olympic Committee by the International Olympic Committee at that time which took effect in December 2012. The tournament was held in Naga City from August 22–25, 2013 at the Jesse Robredo Coliseum.

Results
The tournament was initially planned to be a single round robin with the top two team playing for the championships at the finals.
 The tournament's format was switched into a double round robin format with each team at the tournament facing the other teams twice.

It is unknown what the scoreline is between the one other match between Singapore and Gold Coast. The Philippines emerged champions with Gold Coast placing second and Singapore placing last.

Awards

References

Discovery Women's Basketball Invitational
2013 in women's basketball
2013–14 in Asian basketball
2013–14 in Philippine basketball
2013–14 in Singaporean basketball
2013–14 in Australian basketball
Bask
Bask
Bask